Jenison is a surname. Notable people with the surname include:

Edward H. Jenison (1907–1996), American politician
Madge Jenison (1874–1960), American author, activist and bookstore owner
Matthew Jenison (1654–1734), British politician
Ralph Jenison (1696–1758), British politician
Robert Jenison (1584?–1652), English Puritan cleric and academic